Valavandankottai  is a village in Tiruchirappalli taluk of Tiruchirappalli district in Tamil Nadu, India.

Demographics 

As per the 2001 census, Valavandankottai had a population of 6,969 with 3,519 males and 3,450 females. The sex ratio was 980 and the literacy rate, 83.99.

References 

 

Villages in Tiruchirappalli district